The 1936 season of the Mitropa Cup football club tournament was won by Austria Vienna who defeated the previous champions Sparta Prague 1–0 on aggregate in the final. It was Austria Vienna's second victory in the competition, having previously won the competition in 1933. The two legs of the final were played on 6 September and 13 September.

This was the tenth edition of the tournament, and the first edition in which Swiss clubs competed.

Teams

Preliminary round

|}

First round

|}

Quarterfinals

|}

Semifinals

|}

Finals

|}

Top goalscorers

External links

References

1936–37
1936–37 in European football
1936–37 in Austrian football
1936–37 in Italian football
1936–37 in Czechoslovak football
1936–37 in Hungarian football
1936–37 in Swiss football